Ewunia aureorufa is a species of moth of the family Tortricidae. It is found in Mexico (Tamaulipas).

References

Moths described in 2002
Endemic Lepidoptera of Mexico
Moths of North America
Euliini
Taxa named by Józef Razowski